Overcapitalisation or Overcapitalization, refers to an economic phenomenon whereby the valuation/price of an asset is superior to its ‘real’ value, however difficult to define, therefore putting a strain on attempts to obtain a reasonable return on investment. This is especially the case when capital goods are at stake which are necessary to engage in the production of goods or delivery of services (e.g. agricultural holdings, industrial plants, etc.). It is less the case with those contemporary financial instruments that are valued not for their returns, but for their potential earnings upon resale. Overcapitalisation is closely related (in causes and consequences) to assets inflation. As the financialisation of the economy has led to the monetisation (also called ‘securitisation’) of many non-financial assets, such as real estate, infrastructure, etc., overcapitalisation has become rife, with deleterious consequences at the level of firms (struggling to achieve an unrealistically high level of profitability), households (struggling to pay their inflated mortgage), and individuals (whose equity holding, and hence borrowing and repayment potential, may be vastly over-valued).

Examples 
In his book "Collapse", Jared Diamond gives an example of widespread overcapitalisation (Chapter 13, "Mining" Australia, paragraph on 'imported values') where he describes how settlers in Australia bought or leased land at prices derived from those at 'home' (England), and then were pushed very hard (and usually failed) to achieve the necessary returns, wrecking the fragile resource in the process by over-exploitation.

Problems in business economics